Phước Tuy was a province of the former South Vietnam. 

It now mostly corresponds to Bà Rịa–Vũng Tàu province, just southeast of Ho Chi Minh City in reunified Vietnam.

During the Vietnam War it was the main region of operations for the 1st Australian Task Force.

1 ATF was based in a rubber plantation at Nui Dat, about 8 kilometers north of Ba Ria.

Former provinces of Vietnam
Provinces of South Vietnam
Southeast (Vietnam)